Mitcham was a constituency comprising the emerging Mitcham, Wallington and Beddington suburbs of South London and until 1945 that of Carshalton, its largest of the area's four traditional divisions, in its south-west.  It returned one Member of Parliament (MP)  to the House of Commons of the Parliament of the United Kingdom by the first past the post system.

It was created for the 1918 general election from part of Wimbledon when it reached southwards up onto the North Downs, further south than Croydon South, and was abolished for the February 1974 general election.

Two of its MPs became Home Secretary, one after changing seat of candidature, on boundary reforms.

Boundaries
1918–1945: The Urban Districts of Beddington and Wallington, Carshalton, and Mitcham (the latter as a northern end).

1945–1974: The Municipal Boroughs of Beddington and Wallington, and Mitcham (the latter as a northern end).

Members of Parliament

Feb 1974: constituency abolished: see Mitcham and Morden

Election results

1970s

1960s

1950s

1940s

1930s

1920s

1910s

References 

Parliamentary constituencies in London (historic)
Constituencies of the Parliament of the United Kingdom established in 1918
Constituencies of the Parliament of the United Kingdom disestablished in 1974
Politics of the London Borough of Merton